The First Baptist Church is a historic church at 1 Park Street (corner of Elm) in Waterville, Maine.  Built in 1826, it is the city's oldest standing public building.  It was renovated in 1875 to a design by Francis H. Fassett.  It was listed on the National Register of Historic Places in 1976.

Description and history
The First Baptist Church is located in the center of Waterville, at the northwest corner of Park and Elm Streets.  It is a two-story wood frame structure, with a gabled roof, clapboard siding, and a granite foundation.  It is basically rectangular in plan, with a projecting entry vestibule, and a vestry addition to the rear.  The building's facade is ornately decorated, with paneled corner pilasters rising to bracketed eaves.  Windows are narrow sash, separated between floors by panels, with moulded hoods above the second-floor windows.  A tower rises above the main roof, with a square stage rising to an octagonal louvered belfry and then a steeple with flared base.

The Baptist congregation in Waterville was established in 1818 by Rev. Jeramiah Chaplin, and at first met in the town's meeting house.  In 1824 the congregation began fundraising to build its own church, which resulted in construction of the present building two years later.  In 1875, the building was renovated in the latest Victorian styles to a design by Portland-based Francis H. Fassett, then one of the state's leading architects.

See also
National Register of Historic Places listings in Kennebec County, Maine

References

External links
Official website

Baptist churches in Maine
Churches on the National Register of Historic Places in Maine
Neoclassical architecture in Maine
Churches completed in 1826
19th-century Baptist churches in the United States
Churches in Kennebec County, Maine
Buildings and structures in Waterville, Maine
1826 establishments in Maine
National Register of Historic Places in Kennebec County, Maine
Neoclassical church buildings in the United States